Sinclair Vehicles Ltd was a company formed in March 1983 by Sir Clive Sinclair as a focus for his work in the field of electric vehicles.  The initial investment was £8.6m, which came from the proceeds of the sale of some of Sir Clive's shares in Sinclair Research.  Barrie Wills, formerly of the DeLorean Motor Company, was appointed managing director.

The first (and only) Sinclair Vehicles production model was the single-seater Sinclair C5, launched on 10 January 1985. The generally poor reception given to the C5 by the press and public meant that these models would never reach production.

In August 1985, Hoover, the manufacturer of the C5, announced that production would be stopped due to a financial dispute with Sinclair Vehicles.  The following month, Sinclair Vehicles were renamed as TPD Ltd.  On 15 October 1985, it was announced that TPD were in receivership and the company entered voluntary liquidation on 4 November 1985.

See also
 List of car manufacturers of the United Kingdom

References 
 Excerpt from Sinclair and the 'Sunrise' Technology
 Excerpt from The Sinclair Story
 Excerpt from The battery management

Defunct motor vehicle manufacturers of the United Kingdom
Electric vehicles introduced in the 20th century
Vehicles
Vehicle manufacturing companies established in 1983
1983 establishments in England
Vehicle manufacturing companies disestablished in 1985
1985 disestablishments in England
British companies established in 1983
British companies disestablished in 1985